Sergio Leo de Almeida Pereira (Rio de Janeiro, January 25, 1963) known as Sergio Leo, is a Brazilian writer, journalist and blogger.

Career 
Sergio Leo graduated in journalism from the School of Communication at UFRJ, in 1983 . That same year, he started working as an intern at the newspaper "O Globo". Prior to that, he was a freelancer for the magazines "Manchete" and "Ciência Hoje".

In 1985, he moved to Brasilia where he worked until 1989 as a reporter at the Brasília branch office of the "Jornal do Brasil", and thereafter between 1995 and 1996.
He also worked for other major Brazilian media outlets such as "Folha de S. Paulo", "O Estado de S. Paulo", "ISTOÉ", "O Globo" and TV Globo.
In 2000, he participated in the founding of the newspaper "Valor Econômico", of which he would become a columnist three years later. In 2003, he got a lato sensu postgraduate degree in International Relations at the University of Brasilia (UnB). Between 2002 and 2004, he was professor of Economic Journalism course at UnB.

He was one of the founders and first directors os Associação Brasileira de Jornalismo Investigativo "Abraji".

In 2008 he won the Prêmio Sesc de Literatura with the short stories book "Mentiras do Rio" In 2014, he published the non-fiction book "Ascensão e Queda do Império X", about the Brazilian billionaire Eike Batista.

Literature 
In 2008, he won the SESC Award for Literature with his book of short stories "Mentiras do Rio." and has participated in many short stories anthologies, such as "Desassossego"(Ed. Mombak, org. Luiz Ruffato) and "Conversa de Botequim"(Marcelo Moutinho and Henrique Rodrigues, orgs. Mórula Ed.). In 2014, published "Segundas Pessoas",edited by e-galáxia.

References

External links 
 Sergio Leo at "Valor Econômico" 
 Sergio Leo 

1963 births
Brazilian columnists
Brazilian male writers
Brazilian journalists
Federal University of Rio de Janeiro alumni
Writers from Rio de Janeiro (city)
Living people